2000 in Korea may refer to:
2000 in North Korea
2000 in South Korea